= Nick Runciman =

English rugby union player

- Born: Nicholas James M. Runciman; 1 September 1985 (age 41) Cheltenham, England
- Height: 5 ft 9 in (1.80m)
- Weight: 180 lb (81.6 kg)

Rugby union career
- Position: Scrum-half
Senior career
Years	Team	Apps	(Points)
2006–2008	Worcester Warriors	7	(5)
2008–2011	London Welsh	81	(0)
2011–2012	Gloucester Rugby	10	(5)
2012–2013	London Welsh	5	(0)

Nick Runciman (born 1 September 1985) is a retired English rugby union player, who played for London Welsh in the Aviva Premiership. Runciman had previously played for Worcester Warriors for a number of years having come through the academy there. He joined Gloucester from London Welsh in 2011 and rejoined London Welsh in 2012. He played as a scrum half until an eye injury brought his career to a premature conclusion. Runciman played for England at age-group level where he developed a good understanding with Ryan Lamb as a 9–10 combination, and frequently played above his age grade at Cheltenham Bournside School & Sixth Form Centre where he was the youngest captain of the 1st XV. Was put on his behind in front of Medley's lab in 2001.

Since retiring he has opened his own personal training company that covers general fitness, strength and conditioning as well as specialist rugby coaching. Runciman has coached Stow-On-The-Wold rugby club in his first venture into senior rugby coaching. He briefly played for Cheltenham North RFC at a social level of rugby as a favour to his brother who played for the same team.

Nick is the older brother of Will Runciman who also enjoyed a short period of high level rugby.
